The Illhiedrin Book is an adventure for fantasy role-playing games published by Judges Guild in 1981.

Plot summary
The Illhiedrin Book is a scenario for character levels 1-2.  The adventurers are hired to search the Tomb of Charrellsfane and a wizard's tower for a magical book, but the residents of the tomb and tower dispute their passage, and competing groups dog their tracks.

This scenario is designed for first-level characters, with perhaps one or two second level characters joining them. The wizardess Alcastra wants the Illheidrin Book, formerly owned by a 300-year-dead wizard, and she is willing to help equip a party and send it out to look for the book, although she does not know exactly where the book is.  The adventurers end up heading through the countryside, picking up clues and avoiding the patrols of invading orcs.  There is a mysterious crypt along the way.

Publication history
The Illhiedrin Book was written by Daniel Hauffe, and was published by Judges Guild in 1981 as a 32-page book.

TSR opted not to renew Judges Guild's license for D&D when it expired in September 1980. They managed to hold onto their AD&D license a little while longer, so adventures like The Illhiedrin Book (1981), Zienteck (1981), Trial by Fire (1981), and Rudy Kraft's Portals of Twilight (1981) would finish off that line.

Reception
W. G. Armintrout reviewed the adventure in The Space Gamer No. 53. He stated that "This is a good, sound adventure; I wish more of these were available for low-level characters.  There are complete descriptions of everything you might run into, including Alcastra's Tower (for those who attack everything in sight).  The DM will have no trouble with this adventure." He continued, "Judges Guild" still falls short of perfection.  There are minor discrepancies between maps and descriptions.  The artwork takes up space instead of supporting the adventure.  I can't explain why Lieutenant Sladentail is pictured as a griffon when he's human, and I suspect Alcastra is naked on the cover to spark sales.  Worst of all, the characters are never really fleshed out – the DM will know how to run them, but he may never figure out why they are in this adventure in the first place.  A good adventure, but still short of excellent." Armintrout concluded his review by saying, "I urge everyone who plays AD&D to buy this one.  It's a challenge to anyone with a first-level character, and a solid example for the newcomer DM."

Reviews
 Different Worlds #17 (Dec 1981)

References

Judges Guild fantasy role-playing game adventures
Role-playing game supplements introduced in 1981